Gwil Owen may refer to:

Gwilym Ellis Lane Owen, philosopher
Gwilym Emyr Owen III, songwriter